The GAC Classic was a golf tournament on the LPGA Tour from 1972 to 1973. It was played at the 49ers Country Club in Tucson, Arizona.

Winners
 1973 Judy Rankin
 1972 Betsy Rawls

References

Former LPGA Tour events
Golf in Arizona
Women's sports in Arizona
Sports in Tucson, Arizona
Events in Tucson, Arizona
Recurring sporting events established in 1972
Recurring sporting events disestablished in 1973
1972 establishments in Arizona
1973 disestablishments in Arizona